Tom, Dick and Mary, also known as 90 Bristol Court: Tom, Dick and Mary, is an American situation comedy that aired on NBC from October 5, 1964 until January 4, 1965. It was one of three separate comedies set in the same Los Angeles, California, apartment complex and broadcast under the collective title 90 Bristol Court. Tom, Dick and Mary was canceled after only 13 episodes aired.

Synopsis
Newlyweds Tom and Mary Gentry live together in a new apartment in a fashionable apartment complex at 90 Bristol Court in Los Angeles, California. They cannot afford the apartment on their combined salaries as a medical intern and a medical secretary, respectively, at Valley General Hospital, so Tom's best friend Dick Moran, a swinging bachelor who also is an intern at Valley General, moves in to share expenses with them. Dick often becomes an irritant to the newlyweds as he intrudes on their privacy and "plays the field" in the world of romance. Dr. Krevoy is the chief of staff at the hospital, and Cliff Murdock is the building superintendent and handyman at 90 Bristol Court.

Cast
Don Galloway....Tom Gentry
Steve Franken....Dick Moran 
Joyce Bulifant....Mary Gentry
John Hoyt....Dr. Krevoy
J. Edward McKinley....Horace Moran
Guy Raymond....Cliff Murdock

90 Bristol Court

Tom, Dick and Mary was the third of three 30-minute situation comedies — along with Karen, aired first, and Harris Against the World, which aired between the other two shows — broadcast Monday nights under the umbrella title 90 Bristol Court. Despite all three shows being set at the same Los Angeles apartment complex with the address 90 Bristol Court, the only connection the three series had was the character of handyman Cliff Murdock (portrayed by Guy Raymond), who greeted the residents and visitors to 90 Bristol Court. After the last episodes of Harris Against the World and Tom, Dick and Mary aired on January 4, 1965, 90 Bristol Court ceased to be a programming entity. Although Karen continued to air after the demise of the other two series as a stand-alone show, handyman Murdock disappeared from Karen along with the 90 Bristol Court concept.

Broadcast history

Tom, Dick and Mary premiered on NBC on October 5, 1964, and aired at 8:30 p.m. on Monday throughout its run. It drew low ratings: For the November-to-December 1964 reporting period, the Nielsen ratings ranked it 86th among the 96 prime-time network television shows. Karen and Harris Against the World had even lower ratings. In mid-November 1964 The New York Times reported that NBC planned to cancel both Tom, Dick and Mary and Harris Against the World, effective in early January 1965. Tom, Dick and Mary thus lasted only half a season, and the last of the 13 episodes aired on January 4, 1965.

Peter Tewksbury wrote, produced, and directed all three episodes that aired as part of 90 Bristol Court on November 23, 1964, and used the philosophy of Henry David Thoreau regarding simple living as a starting point for each of them: On Karen, Thoreau influenced Karen and her complicated love life when she mistakenly made three dates for the same Saturday night; on Harris Against the World, Thoreau inspired Harris to take his family fishing, only to find that he had to renew his driver's license that day; and on Tom, Dick and Mary, Dick used Thoreau's philosophy as he attempted to fix several broken household appliances.

Episodes

NOTE: The below list reflects the general consensus of the dates, titles, and plots of the episodes of Tom, Dick and Mary. However, that consensus ascribes the same plot to the episodes of October 19 and November 9. Some sources claim that the episode listed below as airing on January 5 was broadcast on October 19. One source credits Tom Dick, and Mary with only a total of 12 episodes, with no episode at all airing on October 19.

References

External links

90 Bristol Court at Television Obscurities

1964 American television series debuts
1965 American television series endings
1960s American sitcoms
Black-and-white American television shows
English-language television shows
NBC original programming
Television series about marriage
Television series by Universal Television
Television shows set in Los Angeles